Webs is a 2003 science fiction-horror television film directed by David Wu and starring Richard Grieco, Colin Fox and Kate Greenhouse. Produced by the Sci-Fi Channel, it was filmed in Toronto, Ontario, Canada.

Plot

Four electricians, Dean, Junior, Ray and Shelly (nickname for Sheldon), are sent to cut off the power in a condemned building before it's torn down. They notice there's a difference between the floor plans and the actual size of the building. Upon breaking down a door they discover an old laboratory, which encloses an atomic pile (vintage nuclear reactor) powering a weird machine in the floor. They unwittingly set off an alarm and then boot up the device. Dean falls through a dimensional portal that's created and Junior goes after him,  while Ray and Shelly read a journal left behind by the scientists. Dean and Junior appear outside in a deserted and web covered Chicago. Dean goes off to have a look around, while Junior waits for the others. Shelly, by reading the journal, realizes that the researchers were attempting to make a gateway to a parallel universe and he and Ray decide to step through the portal.

Finding no one on the other side of the dimensional portal, Ray and Shelly set off and get a fright when Junior leaps out. Junior leads them to a broken-down security van, with much money in the back. Junior, Ray and Shelly start celebrating, while Dean comes running back armed with a block of wood. Junior suddenly says "Guys" and steps forward with a claw in his stomach. Junior dies, and more creatures (spider people) attack the others. A group of humans save the electricians and kill the creatures. They fight more of the creatures, and head back to the portal, Dean stops to help a survivor and the portal closes leaving him trapped. On Shelly's and Ray's side, the atomic pile shorts the portal. Shelly starts trying to fix it, while Ray goes off to call for help.

The survivors bring Dean into their hideout where they meet Crane. A female survivor, Elayna, insists that Dean come with them to see "The Old Man". She blindfolds him and they set out for the base. Meanwhile, Ray comes back saying that everyone thinks he's insane and refused to send anyone. He did however come back with a small arsenal of guns. Dean meets the Old Man, who is revealed to be Dr. Richard Moreli, the inventor of the portal who got stranded here 30 years ago. Dean tells him his friends are on the other side and trying to fix it. Dr. Moreli tells him when he opened the portal 30 years ago, it let in giant evil Spider Queens into this parallel Earth, who set out to enslave and devour most of humankind. Mankind held out for a while until the ammunition gave out.

Elayna says the "soldiers" (the spider people) used to be normal people, but the Spider Queen's venom makes them completely under her control. Any survivors are made to show the soldiers where their base camp is, so that when others go out and come across these camps, they are empty and bloodstained. They leave the base, to find the Spider Queen has been watching, they hear gunshots and find Shelly and Ray. The survivors bring them back to the base, and Shelly and Moreli begin to build a new portal.

The lookouts later spot "soldiers" in the building and go to hunt them down. Dean and Ray stay behind to defend Shelly and Moreli. Dean gets impatient and goes off to help, leaving Ray alone. Dean, Crane and Elayna, meet up and go back for Moreli, but find Ray with a broken leg and alone. The three set out for the Queen's lair, while Ray stays behind to build traps. They find Moreli in the food chamber, but Shelly has been bitten. Shelly grabs Dean's gun and holds it to his head, telling them to go. The four race back to the base, while Shelly comes face to face with the Queen. Shelly tries to shoot her, but he is too far gone to take the shot. Fully converted by her venom, he leads the Queen and her army back to the base, and the "soldiers" kill everyone but Crane, who kills what remains of her army save Shelly and the Queen. Crane collapses, and Moreli leaves the makeshift lab to go out to him. Crane dies in his arms, and the Queen leaps down and kills Moreli.

Shelly enters the lab, turning off the power. Dean tries to get through to him, but fails and is forced to kill him. Dean and Elayna work hurriedly on the portal, and they are just about to power it up when the Queen shows up. Dean grabs the last two wires to connect, and he connects them to the Queen. The current starts moving between the two, and the Queen gets electrocuted. The portal opens and Dean and Elayna jump through. The strain on the power system causes it to explode, and the Queen to explode with it.

Dean and Elayna wake up on a beach, and they share a kiss, just before the shadow of a large flying animal descends upon them, the two having apparently only made it to another alternate world and not to Dean’s original Earth. Their fate is left to the imagination.

Cast
 Richard Grieco as Dean
 Kate Greenhouse as Elena
 Colin Fox as Dr. Richard Morelli
 Richard Yearwood as Ray
 Jeffrey Douglas as Sheldon
 David Nerman as Crane

Release
The film was released on DVD by Universal Pictures on June 7, 2004. It was released again by Image on Aug 5, 2008.

Reception
The film has received mixed to negative reviews from critics.

Erich Asperschlager from DVD Verdict gave the film a mostly positive review, criticizing the film's predictable beginning and the improbability of the film's conclusion, but also complimented the film's surprisingly effective special effects, summarizing, "Though Webs feels like a combination of elements from much better movies, the sum of those parts is surprisingly tolerable".

References

External links 
 
 
 
 

American science fiction horror films
2003 science fiction films
2003 television films
2003 horror films
2003 films
Films about parallel universes
Syfy original films
2000s English-language films
2000s American films